A minigame (also spelled mini game and mini-game, sometimes called a subgame or microgame) is a short game often contained within another video game. A minigame contains different gameplay elements, and is often smaller or more simplistic, than the game in which it is contained. Some video games consist entirely of minigames which tie into an overall theme, such Olympic Decathlon from 1980. Minigames are also used to represent a specific experience, such as hacking or lock picking or scanning an area, that ties into a larger game.

Minigame compilations 
Some games, such as the WarioWare series (which are called microgames in the series), Universal Research Laboratories's Video Action, some Cinemaware titles like Defender of the Crown, David Whittaker's Lazy Jones or the smartphone satire Phone Story are made up of many minigames strung together into one video game. Some similar games, such as Nintendo's Mario Party series, are considered party games, specifically developed for multiplayer. In party games, minigames usually involve performing an activity faster or collecting more of a specified item than other players to win.

Examples 

The Final Fantasy series includes minigames in every entry, since the first Final Fantasy (1987), in which a 15 puzzle in the form of an Easter egg can be uncovered by entering a specific sequence of inputs while piloting a ship. It was added into the game by programmer Nasir Gebelli despite it not being part of Squaresoft's original game design.

The PocketStation for PlayStation and VMU for Dreamcast accessories allowed the user to download minigames from the main console onto the pocket device, and often then sync progress in the minigame back on to the console. Two examples of this include the Chocobo World minigame inside Final Fantasy VIII.

See also 
 Casual game
 Invade-a-Load
 Minigames of Final Fantasy
 Party game

References 

Video game gameplay
Video game terminology
Video game levels
Minigames